Red Bank Creek is a major stream in Tehama County, California, and a tributary of the Sacramento River. Red Bank Creek, like the other streams draining this part of the western Sacramento Valley, is a highly seasonal stream that flows only during the winter and spring. Old Red Bank Creek Bridge at Red Bluff was built by the Pacific Bridge Company in 1894.

The creek was named for the reddish character of its clay banks. The creek has also been known as Red Bluff Creek, Redbank Creek and Baranca Colorada (Spanish for "red canyon").

See also
List of rivers of California

References

Rivers of Tehama County, California